Błażowa  ( Blazhov) is a town in Rzeszów County, Subcarpathian Voivodeship, Poland, with a population of 2,149 as of December 2021.

History
The area of the gmina of Błażowa in the past was located along the border of Red Ruthenia and Lesser Poland. In the early 14th century, it was part of the Kingdom of Galicia–Volhynia. In 1340 Błażowa was annexed by Polish King Kazimierz Wielki, who created the Sanok Land (1366) and Przemyśl Land, and established several towns in the area (Rzeszów 1354, Brzozow 1359, Tyczyn 1368).

Błażowa remained a village located in Sanok Land. In 1624 the whole area was raided by the Crimean Tatars and another devastating Tatar raid took place in 1672. In 1655 – 56, during the Swedish invasion of Poland, Błażowa was burned down by Swedish and then Transilvanian-Cossack soldiers. Further destruction was brought by the Great Northern War. It is not known when exactly Błażowa received town charter, probably some time between 1770 and 1776.

In 1772, after the first partition of Poland, the whole Sanok Land was annexed by the Habsburg Empire, and became part of Austrian Galicia in which it remained until late 1918.

In May 1907  a fire broke out in the village which over many hours destroyed its wooden buildings. After this disaster the village was rebuilt in a more modern style, new space was recovered in the centre and a new school built. A neo-Gothic church in honour of St Nicholas Martin was built and two new synagogues. In 1909, Błażowa received regular bus connection with Rzeszów, and in 1910, a monument of King Władysław Jagiełło was unveiled, on the 400th anniversary of the Battle of Grunwald.

In the Second Polish Republic (1918–1939), Błażowa belonged to Lwów Voivodeship, and was one of centers of the 1937 peasant strike in Poland. During World War II the village was occupied by the German army. The Home Army was active in the area of Błażowa.

Jews in Błażowa
Błażowa was a shtetl. On 26 June 1941 the Jews of Błażowa, numbering about 930, were forcibly moved to the Rzeszów Ghetto.  They joined Jews from nearby villages and shared their fate. Some were shot on the streets of Rzeszów, others deported to forced-labour camps or shot in Głogów Forest or transported Belzec extermination camp (between 7 and 18 July 1942) where they were gassed on arrival.

Hasidic dynasty

 Rabbi Tzvi Elimelech Spira of Bluzhov (Błażowa) (1841–1924), the Bluzhover Rebbe who was also called the Tzvi Latzaddik.
 His disciple and grandson was Rabbi Yisroel Spira, the Bluzhever Rebbe of America.

References

External links

 Official website 

Cities and towns in Podkarpackie Voivodeship
Rzeszów County
Shtetls
Holocaust locations in Poland